Nancy Lawton (1950–2007) was an American artist. Originally working in graphite to create botanical drawings and portraits, Lawton began working in silverpoint in 1985. Her work is included in the collections of the Smithsonian American Art Museum, the Art Institute of Chicago, the Metropolitan Museum of Art and the Brooklyn Museum of Art.

References

Further reading
 Nancy Lawton review 2005 American Arts Quarterly

1950 births
2007 deaths
Artists from California
20th-century American women artists
21st-century American women artists
People from Gilroy, California